William DeLoach Cope (October 12, 1921 – March 23, 2015) was an American politician. He served as a member of the Mississippi House of Representatives.

Life and career 
Cope was born in Hollandale, Mississippi. He attended Hollandale High School, Millsaps College and the University of Mississippi. He served in the United States Navy.

In 1960, Cope was elected to the Mississippi House of Representatives.

Cope died in March 2015, at the age of 93.

References 

1921 births
2015 deaths
People from Hollandale, Mississippi
Members of the Mississippi House of Representatives
20th-century American politicians
Millsaps College alumni
University of Mississippi alumni